Agiapuk River (also Agee-ee-puk, Ageepuk, Agiopuk, Ahgeeapuk) is a waterway on the Seward Peninsula in the U.S. state of Alaska. It is a tributary to Grantley Harbor from the north. American River is a main tributary.

Geography

The western branch occupies a broad depression which for about  extends parallel with Grantley Harbor and Port Clarence, from which it is separated by an upland of about  elevation. The California River drains a part of this depression through a new, deep-cut canyon. The main part of the Agiapuk emerges from a comparatively narrow valley in these mountains into this depressed area.

The Agiapuk Valley below the forks is filled with flood-plain gravels. These gravels extend up the river. These gravels probably occupy a depression which has been at some time either a lake or arm of the sea and filled with sediments. Where the upper end of the depression is cut by the California River, bed rock is exposed in some places. Schists and limestones with later basalts are exposed in the upland lying between the Agiapuk and Grantley Harbor. North of the Agiapuk, the bed rock consists of Silurian limestones of the Port Clarence formation. These limestones are comparatively unaltered and are generally not mineralized to any extent.

See also
List of rivers of Alaska

References

Rivers of the Seward Peninsula
Rivers of Alaska
Rivers of Nome Census Area, Alaska
Rivers of Unorganized Borough, Alaska